

Timeline

Taxa

Footnotes

References
 
 
 
 
 
 
 Otero et al. (2014), Aristonectes quiriquinensis, sp. nov., a new highly derived elasmosaurid from the upper Maastrichtian of central Chile
 
 
 
 

Plesiosaurs